George Pascoe-Watson (born 21 August 1966) is a British journalist and public relations consultant. He was formerly Political Editor of The Sun newspaper, succeeding Trevor Kavanagh in January 2006. He currently works for the Portland Communications agency founded by Tony Blair's former advisor Tim Allan in 2001.

Early life
Pascoe-Watson was born in Edinburgh in 1966 to an RAF pilot and a nursing sister. He was educated at George Heriot's School and the Royal High School. He completed a two-year journalism diploma at Napier College in Edinburgh.

Career
Pascoe-Walton worked for local newspapers, a news agency and then joined The Sun at the age of 21. He was transferred off The Sun for a spell after he exposed a continued lack of security at Heathrow Airport shortly after the Lockerbie bombing. In his early days at the paper, he was bylined 'Pascoe Watson' as his superiors thought the forename George and his double-barrelled surname to be too effete for the red-top's primarily working-class readership. However they relented after he went into the Lobby.

In 2020, during the COVID pandemic Pascoe-Watson was appointed to an unpaid advisory role by the Department of Health and Social Care (DHSC); he participated in daily strategic discussions chaired by Lord Bethell. He also sent information about government policy to his paying clients before this was made public.

Personal life
Pascoe-Watson married Natalie Kirby in January 2011.

References

External links
 Guardian January 2006
 LA Times 11 April 1989

1966 births
Living people
British male journalists
People educated at George Heriot's School
People educated at the Royal High School, Edinburgh
The Sun (United Kingdom) people